The canonization of the Romanovs (also called "glorification" in the Russian Orthodox Church) was the elevation to sainthood of the last Imperial Family of Russia – Tsar Nicholas II, his wife Tsarina Alexandra, and their five children Olga, Tatiana, Maria, Anastasia, and Alexei – by the Russian Orthodox Church.

The family was killed by the Bolsheviks on 17 July 1918 at the Ipatiev House in Yekaterinburg. The house was later demolished. The Church on Blood was built on this site, and the altar stands over the execution site.

Canonization
On 1 November 1981, Grand Duke Michael Alexandrovich of Russia (the younger brother of Nicholas II) and his secretary, Nicholas Johnson, were canonized by the Russian Orthodox Church Outside of Russia. The two men were both murdered at Perm on 13 June 1918.

On 15 August 2000, the Russian Orthodox Church announced the canonization of Nicholas II and his immediate family for their "'humbleness, patience and meekness'" during their imprisonment and execution by the Bolsheviks.

On 3 February 2016, the Bishops' Council of the Russian Orthodox Church canonized Nicholas II's personal physician, Eugene Botkin, as a righteous passion bearer.

Controversy

The canonizations were controversial for both branches of the Russian Orthodox Church. In 1981, opponents noted Nicholas II's perceived weaknesses as a ruler and said that his actions had led to the Bolshevik Revolution, which caused so much damage for Russia and its people. One priest of the Russian Orthodox Church Abroad noted that martyrdom in the Russian Orthodox Church has nothing to do with the martyr's personal actions but was instead related to why he or she was killed. Other critics noted that the Russian Orthodox Church Abroad appeared to be blaming Jewish revolutionaries for the deaths and equating the political assassination with a ritual murder.

Others rejected the family's being classified as new martyrs because they were not killed because of their religious faith. There was no proof that the execution was a ritual murder. Religious leaders in both churches also had objections to canonizing the Tsar's family because they perceived him to have been a weak emperor whose incompetence led to the revolution, and the suffering of his people. They said he was at least partially responsible for his own murder and the murders of his wife and children. For these opponents, the fact that the Tsar was, in private life, a kind man and a good husband and father did not override his poor governance of Russia.

Despite their official designation as "passion-bearers" by the August 2000 Council, the family are referred to as "martyrs" in Church publications, icons, and in popular veneration by the people.

Since the late 20th century, believers have attributed healing from illnesses or conversion to the Orthodox Church to their prayers to Maria and Alexei, as well as to the rest of the family.

Discovery of bodies
The bodies of Tsar Nicholas II, Tsarina Alexandra, and three of their daughters were discovered in 1979. Remains of two of the children, believed to be Maria and Alexei, were missing from the unmarked grave. The discovery of the Romanov remains was not acknowledged by the government until 1989 during the glasnost period. Following confirmation of identities through forensic and DNA analysis, the Imperial Family was interred in a state funeral at St. Peter and Paul Cathedral in St. Petersburg on 17 July 1998, eighty years after they were murdered.

It was not until 2007 that the remains of Alexei and one of his sisters were found at a second unmarked gravesite, about 70 meters from the first.  On 23 August 2007, a Russian archaeologist announced the discovery of two burned, partial skeletons at a bonfire site at Ganina Yama near Yekaterinburg that appeared to match the site described in assassin Yakov Yurovsky's memoirs. The archaeologists said the bones are from a boy who was roughly between the ages of ten and thirteen years at the time of his death and of a young woman who was roughly between the ages of eighteen and twenty-three years old. Anastasia was seventeen years, one month old at the time of the assassination, while her sister Maria was nineteen years, one month old; and her brother Alexei was two weeks shy of his fourteenth birthday. Anastasia's elder sisters Olga and Tatiana were twenty-two and twenty-one years old at the time of the assassination. Along with the remains of the two bodies, archaeologists found "shards of a container of sulfuric acid, nails, metal strips from a wooden box, and bullets of various caliber."

Preliminary testing indicated a "high degree of probability" that the remains belong to the Tsarevich Alexei and to one of his sisters, Russian forensic scientists announced on 22 January 2008. The Yekaterinburg region's chief forensic expert Nikolai Nevolin indicated the results would be compared against those obtained by foreign experts. On April 30, 2008, Russian forensic scientists announced that DNA testing proves that the remains belong to the Tsarevich Alexei and to one of his sisters.

Gallery

See also 

 Tsarebozhiye

References

External links

In Memory of the Royal Martyrs, by St. John of Shanghai and San Francisco
The Royal Martyrs of Russia (Fr. Netarios Serfes)
New Martyrs, Confessors, and Passion-Bearers of Russia
Video of the canonization of 1 November 1981 by the Russian Church Abroad
Video of the canonization of 20 August 2000 by the Moscow Patriarchate

20th-century Christian saints
Russian Orthodox child saints
Canonization
Canonization
Passion bearers
Russian saints of the Eastern Orthodox Church
Romanovs
Eastern Orthodox royal saints
House of Romanov
Romanovs
Blood libel